"Smoke, Drink, Break-Up" is a song by American recording artist Mila J. It was released on January 29, 2014, as the first single from her debut extended play, Made in L.A. (2014).

Music video
The music video for the song, directed by Blue Gregory, premiered via Mila's Vevo channel on March 20, 2014. Singer Ty Dolla Sign appears in the video.

Remixes
The first remix of "Smoke, Drink, Break-Up" featuring French Montana, was released on May 19, 2014. The official remix of the song features Ty Dolla Sign, Kirko Bangz, and Problem was released on May 23, 2014.

Charts

References

External links

2014 songs
Mila J songs
2014 singles
Universal Motown Records singles